The 1970 FA Charity Shield was the 48th FA Charity Shield, the annual football match played between the winners of the previous season's Football League and FA Cup competitions. It was contested between Everton, the reigning First Division champions, and Chelsea, holders of the FA Cup. Goals from Alan Whittle and Howard Kendall gave Everton a 2–1 victory; Chelsea's goal was scored by Ian Hutchinson. The match was staged at Stamford Bridge, Chelsea's home ground.

Match details

See also
1970–71 in English football
1970–71 FA Cup

1970
Charity Shield 1970
Charity Shield 1970
Comm
Charity Shield